Lukas Stadler (born 28 October 1990) is an Austrian footballer.

References

Austrian footballers
Austrian Football Bundesliga players
Kapfenberger SV players
Grazer AK players
1990 births
Living people
People from Bruck an der Mur
Association football defenders
Footballers from Styria